Chengkou County is a county in Chongqing municipality, China, and is the northernmost county-level division of Chongqing, bordering the provinces of Shaanxi and Sichuan to the north and west, respectively. To the northeast, the county borders Zhengping County, Pingli County, Langao County and Ziyang County of Ankang, Shaanxi. To the west, the county borders Wanyuan and Xuanhan County of Dazhou, Sichuan. To the south, the county borders Chongqing's Kaizhou District and Wuxi County.

Administrative divisions
Chengkou County is composed of two subdistricts, ten towns, and thirteen townships. It formerly had 7 towns and 17 townships.

Two subdistricts (街道):
 Gecheng Subdistrict (before 2009 Gecheng Town), Fuxing Subdistrict

Ten towns (镇):
 Bashan, Pingba, Miaoba, Mingtong, Xiuqi, Gaoguan, Gaoyan (before 2012 Gaoyan Township), Dong'an (before 2014 Dong'an Township), Xianyi (before 2014 Xianyi Township), Gaonan (before 2014 Gaonan Township)

Thirteen townships (乡):
 Longtian Township, Beiping Township, Zuolan Township, Yanhe Township, Shuanghe Township, Liaozi Township, Jiming Township, Zhouxi Township, Mingzhong Township, Zhiping Township, Lantian Township, Houping Township, Heyu Township

Climate

References

External links
Official website of Chengkou County Government

 
County-level divisions of Chongqing